Thomas Gibson (born c. 1680 - died 28 April 1751) was an English portrait painter and copyist, notable as master of George Vertue. He was born and died in London.

Life
Nothing known of Gibson's life before c. 1711, when he was already established as portrait painter, appointed a founding director of Godfrey Kneller's Academy in London at Great Queen Street. According to the painter Thomas Highmore, Sir James Thornhill applied to Gibson to sketch for him in his large pictures figures in action. among his pupils there was George Vertue. Gibson's sitters included a number of important public figures: Dr Henry Sacheverell (1710; Oxford, Magdalen Coll.), John Flamsteed (1712; Oxford, Bodleian Lib.), Sir Robert Walpole (untraced; engr. G. Bockman), Archbishop William Wake (Oxford, Christ Church Pict. Gal.) and Archbishop John Potter (London, Lambeth Pal.). His most constant patron was John Poulett, 1st Earl Poulett (1663–1743), who commissioned a great number of originals and copies.

Gibson's career was interrupted in 1729-31 by serious illness, and he was obliged to sell his collection and for a time retire to Oxford. After resuming his practice he was patronized by Augusta, Princess of Wales, who in 1742 commissioned a group portrait of her four children, as well as her own portrait (both British Royal Col.).

References

Sources

External links 

English portrait painters
17th-century English painters
English male painters
18th-century English painters
1751 deaths
1680s births
18th-century English male artists